The 1979–80 Montreal Canadiens season was the team's 71st season. The Canadiens ended the season with a twenty-game unbeaten streak at the Montreal Forum. By season's end, the franchise was third overall in NHL standings. The season involved being eliminated in the NHL Quarter-finals vs the Minnesota North Stars 4 games to 3.

Offseason
 Al MacNeil left his position as head coach of the Canadiens farm club, the Nova Scotia Voyageurs, to become head coach of the Atlanta Flames.
 Jacques Lemaire retired to become a playing coach in Switzerland. In addition, Ken Dryden and captain Yvan Cournoyer also retired from the team.
 Scotty Bowman, upset over the appointment of Irving Grundman as general manager in 1978, left the club to become head coach and general manager of the Buffalo Sabres.
 Boom Boom Geoffrion was hired as head coach in September 1979. In his previous coaching stint, Geoffrion lasted half a season with the 1968–69 New York Rangers. He had to leave the position due to ulcers.
 Veteran defenceman Serge Savard is named team captain.
 The Canadiens did not have a first-round pick in the Amateur Draft. The club picked Mats Naslund with its second-round choice, 37th over-all. The team picked Guy Carbonneau in the third-round, 44th over-all.

Regular season
Despite a record of fifteen wins, nine losses and six ties, Geoffrion stepped down as head coach.

Final standings

Schedule and results

Playoffs
The Canadiens swept the Hartford Whalers in the preliminary round 3–0 in games. The Canadiens then faced the Minnesota North Stars in the quarter-final and lost a seven-game series four games to three.

Player statistics

Regular season
Scoring

Goaltending

Playoffs
Scoring

Goaltending

Awards and records
Larry Robinson, Norris Trophy

Transactions

Draft picks

Farm teams

See also
 1979–80 NHL season

References

Montreal Canadiens seasons
Montreal Canadiens season, 1979-80
Norris Division champion seasons
Montreal